Tom Cronin may refer to:

 Thomas Cronin (born 1940), political scientist and professor
 Tom Cronin (hurler), hurler who plays with Kerry and Crotta O'Neill's